Super Aguri F1 was a Formula One team that competed from  to . The team, founded by former F1 driver Aguri Suzuki, was based in Tokyo, Japan, but operated from the former Arrows factory at the Leafield Technical Centre, Oxfordshire, England. The cars were referred to as Super Aguri Hondas, with the team functioning to some degree as an unofficial Honda 'B'-team. After participating in the championship for 2 years and 4 months, the team withdrew from F1 after 4 races in the  season due to financial difficulties. Throughout the team's time in the sport, it scored four points, all of which were scored by Takuma Sato during the  season.

Team creation
Honda had completed the buyout of British American Racing at the end of 2005, keeping Jenson Button as lead driver, but displacing Takuma Sato in favor of Rubens Barrichello after Sato scored only a single point that year, which was his second full season with the team. In Japan, public pressure and Sato's continued popularity persuaded Honda to help Sato continue to compete in Formula One. This was influential in the creation of Super Aguri's F1 project and the engine supply from Super Aguri's official partner Honda.

Talks to start the team began in February 2005, but it was not until September that plans started to take shape. The team registered its intention to enter the Formula One World Championship to the FIA, Formula One's governing body, on 1 November (ahead of the governing body's 15 November deadline). However, the FIA's official press release of the entry list for 2006 confirmed that it had not approved Super Aguri's entry: this was reported to be due to the team's failure to produce the required $48 million entry bond on time. The team re-applied for entry in 2006, and continued to prepare cars for the upcoming season.
Having missed the initial registration, the team needed to convince the existing ten teams to unanimously agree to its entry. It appeared that the Midland team was blocking on the grounds of potentially reduced TV revenue, but it was eventually granted the necessary unanimous agreement and the team's entry was confirmed by the FIA on 26 January 2006.

Racing history

2006

In , the cars were powered by customer Honda engines (RA806E 2.4 V8), and used Bridgestone tyres. The chassis, SA05, was an updated version of the  Arrows A23, bought from ex-Minardi principal Paul Stoddart who purchased them when the Arrows team went into receivership. As such, the team's car, infrastructure and even operating base had its origins with TWR Arrows. Underlining the links to the former team, the technical side was overseen by former Arrows engineer Mark Preston, who brought many of the old Arrows mechanics back with him. The team had announced plans to produce a new in-house chassis later on in the 2006 season, possibly for the European races, but this never came into fruition. Instead, the team updated their older chassis to become the SA06 – a change which was visible from the German Grand Prix at Hockenheim, onwards.

Takuma Sato and Yuji Ide were the initial race drivers for the team in the 2006 season, with Franck Montagny as the third driver. Ide's selection was puzzling due to his age (the oldest F1 rookie at 31 years), lack of European racing experience, and not speaking English; nonetheless, Aguri Suzuki was initially adamant on promoting Japanese talent.

The team made it onto the grid for the start of the season. In its debut race at Bahrain, Sato successfully completed the Grand Prix while Ide retired on lap 35 with a mechanical failure and after nearly running over his pit crew. Suzuki deemed this race to be a good test for the team as the car had only done a maximum of 10 laps during pre-season testing. The team's second race (in Malaysia) was little better, with again only Sato finishing the race.

Ide said "This is the first time that both Taku and I have finished a race, so I am happy about that."

Ide was reprimanded by the race stewards.  

On 10 May 2006, the FIA Permit Office revoked Ide's Super Licence, thus preventing his return to an F1 seat until at least the 2007 season.

When the updated car (the SA06) was first raced in the German Grand Prix, it managed to impress, with decent qualifying positions (managing to outperform the Midland F1 Team), although failing to finish the race.

2007

Reports suggesting that the team would be using the works Honda chassis of 2006 came under intense resistance by rival teams Williams and Spyker, who contested that the practice was against Formula One regulations. The teams cited the fact that the Concorde Agreement mandated a car may not use any parts designed or constructed by another manufacturer of Formula One cars. Super Aguri (as well as Scuderia Toro Rosso and Red Bull) seemed to be in violation about this. The FIA however did not have the authority to act on the Concorde Agreement without the matter already being resolved in court. However, Super Aguri (as well as the Red Bull teams) stated that they were in compliance with the sport's regulations, though the matter was still of great contention.

Super Aguri announced on 15 November 2006 that Takuma Sato and Anthony Davidson (previously Honda third and test driver) would be driving for the team in 2007. Super Aguri also confirmed, on 15 December, that Giedo van der Garde would be their third driver in the 2007 season.  However, the Dutchman left for Spyker F1 before the season began. Sakon Yamamoto, who was a second driver in late 2006, went back to being a test driver in 2007.

The team suffered a major setback when their car for 2007 failed the FIA crash test, with the rear of the car being destroyed more than is allowed. On 2 March, Super Aguri pushed back the launch of its new car by two days, with the SA07 unveiled less than 48 hours before the first practice session for the Australian Grand Prix. Team's drivers Davidson and Sato shocked many people with getting 10th and 11th place in qualifying for Australian GP. Until this, the best result in qualification set by this team was 17th place (by Takuma Sato). Sato dropped to 12th by the race's end, while Anthony Davidson's race was ruined on the very first lap when Spyker's Adrian Sutil collided with him after a failed passing move. Davidson's car was thrown into the air, severely jarring his back upon landing.  He drove through the pain to finish 16th and was taken to hospital following the race.

Shortly before the 2007 Australian Grand Prix, the team announced SS United Group Oil & Gas Company as its title sponsor.  Also in 2007 Super Aguri signed an official supplier agreement with Speakerbus to supply race intercom.  However, SS United Group defaulted on sponsorship payments, forcing the team to cut as many as 30 staff.

At the  the team scored its first point ever, when Takuma Sato finished in 8th place. The Japanese driver benefited from the high attrition rate which saw cars usually in the points from Ferrari, BMW Sauber, Toyota and Williams drop out.

At the  the team scored its highest finish to that date, with Takuma Sato finishing 6th and garnering 3 points, passing defending world champion Fernando Alonso on track en route. ITV commentators mention that had it not been for a botched pit stop, Sato may have finished as high as fourth. Teammate Davidson also looked set to finish in the points until he hit a gopher which ran across the track, forcing him to pit and leaving him out of the points.

2008

Super Aguri kept their  drivers Takuma Sato and Anthony Davidson, following the acquisition of an unspecified portion of the team by the Magma Group. Luca Filippi was once linked to a drive in 2008. However, he then signed to the GP2 team ART Grand Prix partnering Romain Grosjean. On 8 January 2008 the team announced that the SA08 would be launched in Barcelona, Spain. On 12 February Super Aguri postponed the SA08 launch and did not announce for how long due to their uncertainty of the future of the team. The team then said that although it had cancelled its attendance at the final pre-season tests because some parts had not arrived, it expected to compete at the first race of the 2008 season in Australia. However, Magma pulled out of their proposed takeover, leaving Super Aguri's future in doubt again.

The Super Aguri F1 Team travelled to Barcelona and competed in the 2008 Spanish Grand Prix, allegedly aided by financial support from Bernie Ecclestone. On arrival at the Istanbul Park for the 2008 Turkish Grand Prix, Super Aguri's trucks and motorhomes were denied entry to the circuit, because Honda Racing CEO Nick Fry reportedly told the race organizers that Super Aguri would not be taking part. On 6 May 2008, team founder and principal Aguri Suzuki announced that they were to withdraw from the 2008 FIA Formula One World Championship with immediate effect due to financial problems, citing the breach of contract by the promised partner SS United Group Oil & Gas Company resulting in the loss of financial backing as putting the team into financial difficulties.
It was confirmed on 7 May that Super Aguri had gone into administration, after a team of corporate recovery partners was appointed to seek a buyer for the operation.

In spite of the fact that it is mentioned the Magma Group pulled out, it was down to Nick Fry not accepting the 3-year debt payment plan Magma Group proposed. Fry wanted the whole payment at once or he would not allow the team to compete.

The team's assets were bought by German businessman Franz Hilmer (Formtech GmbH), who applied unsuccessfully to enter the 2010 FIA Formula One World Championship using the Brabham name. The intellectual property of the team is still owned by Formtech Composites, which is situated at the factory in Leafield, United Kingdom.

Complete Formula One results
(key)

References

External links

Super Aguri profile page at Formula1.com
An archived version of Super Aguri's profile page at Formula 1.com

Formula One constructors
Formula One entrants
Japanese auto racing teams
Japanese racecar constructors
Companies established in 2006